Printing Industries of America was a nonprofit trade association which advocates for the United States printing industry. 

It was the world’s largest graphic arts trade association, representing more than 6,500 member companies and an industry with more than $174.4 billion in revenue and 1 million employees. Its purpose was to provide representation, training, education, research, and publications to the printing industry. 

Established in 1887, it had no permanent headquarters until 1902 when an office opened in New York City. In 1908 the office was moved to Philadelphia and in 1912 it was moved to Chicago, where it remained until a move to Washington, DC in 1929. On November 16, 2003 the main headquarters were announced to be moved to Sewickley, Pennsylvania, a suburb of Pittsburgh, the move was completed within a year. In 2015, the main headquarters moved to Warrendale, PA. Printing Industries of America continues to have a lobbying presence in Washington.

In 1999 PIA consolidated with the Graphic Arts Technical Foundation becoming Printing Industries of America/Graphic Arts Technical Foundation (PIA/GATF) utilizing a logo that was a combination of the two independent organizations logos. In 2009 after an extensive re-branding initiative, the association changed its name to Printing Industries of America and unveiled a new logo. The Graphic Arts Technical Foundation activities are carried out under the auspices of the Center for Technology and Research.

In 2020, PIA merged with the Specialty Graphic Imaging Association to form the PRINTING United Alliance.

References

External links
Printing Industries of America homepage
Great Lakes Graphics Association - Great Lakes Graphics Association is the merger of the Printing Industry of Illinois/Indiana and the Printing Industries of Wisconsin to serve the printing and graphic arts fields throughout Indiana, Illinois and Wisconsin. GLGA is a regional affiliate of Printing Industries of America and is located in Pewaukee, WI.

Trade associations based in the United States
Organizations based in Pittsburgh